Laura Fortunato may refer to the following people:

 Laura Fortunato (academic)
 Laura Fortunato (referee)